Michele Morosini (1308 – 16 October 1382) was the Doge of Venice for a few months, from 10 June 1382 to his death in October the same year.

Born in one of the most important Venetian families, Morosini was extremely wealthy. Opinions about him are varied, though, and he is seen either as a devoted servant of the Republic, or as a speculator who enriched himself on real estate during the hard times of the War of Chioggia, fought between Venice and Genoa between 1378 and 1381.

Elected after the death of Doge Andrea Contarini, he died very soon of the plague and was buried in the church of San Zanipolo, a traditional burial place of the doges. He was married to Cristina Condulmiero.

His statue (number 31) is erected in the outer ring in the southeast quarter of the Prato della Valle in Padova.

References

14th-century Doges of Venice
Michele
14th-century deaths from plague (disease)
1308 births
1382 deaths
Burials at Santi Giovanni e Paolo, Venice